Ali Nassirian (born February 4, 1935) is an Iranian actor. He has received various accolades, including two Crystal Simorghs, a Hafez Award, an Iran's Film Critics and Writers Association Award and a Sepas Award. Nasirian, Mohammad Ali Keshavarz, Ezatollah Entezami, Jamshid Mashayekhi and Davoud Rashidi are known as "the five most important actors in the history of Iranian cinema" because of their influence.

Film career 
He first appeared in a supporting role in Dariush Mehrjui's The Cow (1969) alongside Ezatollah Entezami, another Iranian actor. Nassirian then played the title role of Mr. Naive (1970), also by Mehrjui. His other films include: The Postman (1971), The Cycle (1974), The Mandrake (1975), Kamalolmolk (1983), Mirza Norouz's Shoes (1985), Stone Lion (1986), Captain Khorshid (1987), The Scent of Joseph's Shirt (1995), and Iron Island (2005), Masxarebaz (2019) for which he received the Crystal Simorgh award for the best supporting actor. He played the lead role in The Saturday Hunter (2011), and Sun Children (2020).

Filmography

Film 
 Sun Children (2020)
Laminor (2020)
A Hairy Tale (2019)
Emperor of Hell (2017)
Tale of The Sea (2017)
Iran Burger (2015)
 Cage Sauts Fous (2003)
 The Scent of Joseph's Coat (1995)
 Le grand jour (1989)
 Captain Khorshid (1987)
 Routes Frosty (1985)
 Chaussures Mirza Norooz (1985)
 Kamalolmolk (1984)
 The Cycle (1974)
 Sattar Khan (1972)
 Mr. Naive (1971)
 The Cow (1969)

Television 
 Sarbedaran (1983–1984)
 Hezar Dastan (1987)
 The Forbidden Fruit (2007–2008)

Web 
 Shahrzad (2015)

Plays 
 2012: The Actor and His Wife, Niavaran Cultural Center, writer and actor, direct by Mohsen Moeini Negin Mirhasani Vahed
 2012: Dozing-off Niavaran Cultural Center, writer and actor, direct by Mohsen Moeini

References 

 Ali Nassirian's profile at IranActor.com

External links 

Living people
1935 births
People from Tehran
Male actors from Tehran
Iranian male stage actors
20th-century Iranian male actors
21st-century Iranian male actors
Recipients of the Order of Culture and Art
Crystal Simorgh for Best Supporting Actor winners
Iranian Science and Culture Hall of Fame recipients in Cinema